King of the Ghetto is a 1986 British four-part television drama miniseries which was aired on BBC Two, it was directed and written by Farrukh Dhondy, and stars Tim Roth. The drama is about racial tensions in the East End of London in the 1980s.

Overview
Set in and around Brick Lane, white Matthew Long (Tim Roth) mobilises his Bengali neighbours around a squatting campaign in defiance of the Labour-run council. Also, young Bengali vigilantes patrol the streets against National Front skinheads and white liberal Sadie Deedes (Gwyneth Strong) argues for an Islamic school. Meanwhile, Bangladeshi businessman Timur Hussein (Zia Mohyeddin) accumulates wealth and power by trading profitably with local politicians, criminals and police officers simultaneously.

Cast
Tim Roth as Matthew Long
Zia Mohyeddin as Timur Hussein
Gwyneth Strong as Sadie Deedes
Ian Dury as Sammy
Ajay Kumar as Raja
Dinesh Shukia as Saliq Miah
Aftab Sachak as Riaz Miah
Shelley King as Nasreen Begum
Paul Anil as Jamal Ullah

Episodes

Reception
In 2014, Dave Hill of The Guardian said, "In King of the Ghetto we see the unfolding of a grassroots struggle... Thirty years on, some things have changed, some have not, but the big themes explored in Dhondy's drama survive."

See also
East End of London
British Bangladeshi

References

External links

1986 British television series debuts
1986 British television series endings
1980s British drama television series
1980s British television miniseries
British drama television series
English-language television shows
Urdu-language television shows
BBC television dramas
Television shows set in London
British Bangladeshi mass media